Kurali (also: Kurali) is a Village, Village Council in the Ambala district of the Indian state of Haryana, located 8 km South to Naraingarh.

Demographics

Population
Kurali is a Village located in Ambala district of Haryana.

As per the Census India 2011, Kurali Village has 770 households, population of 4,222 of which 2,278 are males and 1,944 are females. The population of children between age 0-6 is 620 which is 14.68% of total population.

The sex-ratio of Kurali Village is around 853 compared to 879 which is average of Haryana state. The literacy rate of Kurali is 71.4% out of which 76.53% males are literate and 65.38% females are literate. The total area of Kurali is 9 km2 with population density of 470 per km2.

Religion
Hinduism is the prominent religion of Kurali followed by 93.36% of the population. Sikhism is the second most popular religion in the city followed 4.64% of the people. In Kurali Islam is followed by 1.75% and those that didn't state a religion are 0.25%.

Languages
Hindi is the official language of Kurali. English and Punjabi are additional official languages. Government schools use English and Hindi textbooks.

Gallery

References 

Villages in Ambala district
Ambala district
Tourism in Haryana